An egg hunt is an Eastertide game during which decorated eggs or Easter eggs are hidden for children to find. Real hard-boiled eggs, which are typically dyed or painted, artificial eggs made of plastic filled with chocolate or candies, or foil-wrapped egg-shaped chocolates of various sizes are hidden in various places; as many people give up sweets as their Lenten sacrifice, individuals consume them after having abstained from them during the preceding forty days of Lent. 

The game is often played outdoors, but can also be played indoors. The children typically collect the eggs in a basket. When the hunt is over, prizes may be given out for various achievements, such as the largest number of eggs collected, for the largest or smallest egg, for the most eggs of a specific color, consolation prizes or booby prizes. Real eggs may further be used in egg tapping contests. If eggs filled with confetti left from Mardi Gras (cascarones) are used, then an egg fight may follow. Eggs are placed with varying degree of concealment, to accommodate children of varying ages and development levels. In South German folk traditions it was customary to add extra obstacles to the game by placing them into hard-to reach places among nettles or thorns.

History

The egg was a symbol of the rebirth of the earth in pre-Christian celebrations of spring. However, the Easter egg itself was defined by early Christians as an Easter symbol of the resurrection of Jesus: the egg symbol was likened to the tomb from which Christ arose.  Lizette Larson-Miller, a professor with the Graduate Theological Union of Berkeley, traces the specific custom of the Easter egg hunt to the Protestant Christian Reformer Martin Luther, stating "We know that Martin Luther had Easter egg hunts where the men hid the eggs for the women and children, and it probably has this connection back to this idea of eggs being the tomb." At least since the 17th century the idea of the Easter Bunny to bring the Easter eggs has been known. The novelty of the introduction of Easter egg hunts into England is evidenced by A. E. Housman's inaugural lecture as Professor of Latin at University College, London in 1892, in which he said, "In Germany at Easter time they hide coloured eggs about the house and garden that the children may amuse themselves in discovering them."

Reverend MaryJane Pierce Norton, Associate General Secretary of Leadership Ministries at the General Board of Discipleship, states that "there’s something about going to hunt the eggs just as we might go to hunt for Jesus in the tomb. And when we find them it’s that joy that the women had when they reached the tomb first and found that Jesus was no longer there." Traditionally the game is associated with Easter and Easter eggs, but it has also been popular with spring time birthday parties. Egg hunts are a subject of the Guinness Book of World Records; Homer, Georgia, United States was listed in 1985 with 80,000 eggs to hunt in a town of 950 people.

To enable children to take part in egg hunts despite visual impairment, eggs have been created that emit various clicks, beeps, noises, or music.

Commercial use

A number of companies have made use of the popularity of Easter and more specifically Easter egg hunts to promote the sales of their candy products. Most notable have been chocolatiers including Cadbury with their annual Easter Egg Trail which takes place in over 250 National Trust locations in the UK. In 2015, the British chocolate company Thorntons worked with the geocaching community to hide chocolate eggs across the United Kingdom.

See also
Egg and spoon race
Egg dance
Egg rolling
Egg tapping
Pace Egg play
Easter basket

References

Traditional Easter games
Hunt
Easter Bunny